Eldrid Nordbø (born 12 August 1942) is a Norwegian politician for the Labour Party. She was personal secretary to the Minister of Social Affairs in 1971, state secretary to the prime minister (1986–89), and Minister of Trade and Shipping (1990–91). She is married to economist and politician Bjørn Skogstad Aamo.

References

1942 births
Living people
Ministers of Trade and Shipping of Norway
Labour Party (Norway) politicians